Tuija Annika Hyyrynen (born 10 March 1988) is a Finnish footballer who plays as a defender for the Finland women's national team.

Hyyrynen previously played for Umeå IK in Sweden's Damallsvenskan; HJK Helsinki and Åland United in Finland's Naisten Liiga. In 2010 Hyyrynen played in America, with Florida State Seminoles and Pali Blues. She signed for Juventus in 2017.

Since her senior debut against Scotland in September 2007, Hyyrynen has been a member of the Finland women's national football team. She took part in UEFA Women's Euro 2009. In June 2013 Hyyrynen was named in national coach Andrée Jeglertz's Finland squad for UEFA Women's Euro 2013.

International goals

Honours
HJK
 Naisten Liiga: 2005
 Naisten Suomen Cup: 2006, 2007, 2008

Juventus
 Serie A: 2017–18, 2018–19, 2019–20, 2020–21, 2021–22
 Coppa Italia: 2018–19, 
 Supercoppa Italiana: 2019, 2020–21, 2021–22

References

External links

 
 
 
 Player's profile at Football Association of Finland 

1988 births
Living people
Finnish women's footballers
Finland women's international footballers
Expatriate women's footballers in Sweden
Expatriate women's footballers in Denmark
USL W-League (1995–2015) players
Damallsvenskan players
Fortuna Hjørring players
Umeå IK players
Åland United players
Kansallinen Liiga players
Helsingin Jalkapalloklubi (women) players
FC Honka (women) players
Expatriate women's soccer players in the United States
Florida State Seminoles women's soccer players
Finnish expatriate footballers
Florida State University alumni
Juventus F.C. (women) players
Serie A (women's football) players
Finnish expatriate sportspeople in Italy
Expatriate women's footballers in Italy
Women's association football defenders
FIFA Century Club
UEFA Women's Euro 2022 players